Vicenç Vidal Matas (born 31 May 1980 in  Esporles, Spain) is a Spanish politician and senator. He is the senator representing Balearic Islands for Més per Mallorca in the of Senate of Spain since July 12, 2019. He formerly Minister of the Environment, Agriculture and Fisheries of the Government of the Balearic Islands in the IX legislature.

References 

Living people
1980 births
Spanish politicians
21st-century Spanish politicians